Cara Murray (born 1 November 2000) is an Irish cricketer. She made her Women's Twenty20 International cricket (WT20I) debut for Ireland against New Zealand on 6 June 2018. She plays in the Women's Super Series for Dragons.

She made her Women's One Day International cricket (WODI) debut for Ireland, also against New Zealand, on 8 June 2018. On her debut, she returned the worst bowling figures in WODIs, with two wickets for 119 runs from her ten overs.

In June 2018, she was named in Ireland's squad for the 2018 ICC Women's World Twenty20 Qualifier tournament. In July 2020, she was awarded a non-retainer contract by Cricket Ireland for the following year. In November 2021, she was named in Ireland's team for the 2021 Women's Cricket World Cup Qualifier tournament in Zimbabwe.

References

External links
 
 

2000 births
Living people
Cricketers from Belfast
Irish women cricketers
Ireland women One Day International cricketers
Ireland women Twenty20 International cricketers
Dragons (women's cricket) cricketers
Scorchers (women's cricket) cricketers